Davor Dželalija (born 26 February 1968) is a Croatian retired footballer and most recently manager of NK Krk.

Playing career

Club
During his club career he played for numerous clubs in Croatia and has also had two years with Toledo in Spain, where he played alongside Unai Emery, and a year in Singapore. In Croatia, he was HNK Rijeka's top scorer during the 1994–95 season.

Managerial career
After spending eleven years coaching various age groups at Orijent, he successfully managed at third tier-club NK Krk. He was rehired by them in June 2019 but in April 2021 left by mutual consent.

External links

References

1968 births
Living people
Sportspeople from Šibenik
Association football forwards
Yugoslav footballers
Croatian footballers
NK Zagora Unešić players
NK Mosor players
HNK Šibenik players
RNK Split players
HNK Orijent players
HNK Rijeka players
CD Toledo players
NK Jadran Poreč players
Tanjong Pagar United FC players
NK Pomorac 1921 players
Croatian Football League players
First Football League (Croatia) players
Segunda División players
Singapore Premier League players
Croatian expatriate footballers
Expatriate footballers in Spain
Croatian expatriate sportspeople in Spain
Expatriate footballers in Singapore
Croatian expatriate sportspeople in Singapore
Croatian football managers
HNK Orijent managers